Crusader Kings II is a grand strategy game developed by Paradox Development Studio and published by Paradox Interactive. Set in the Middle Ages, the game was released on February 14, 2012, as a sequel to 2004's Crusader Kings. On October 18, 2019, the video game became free to play. A sequel, Crusader Kings III, was released on September 1, 2020. Crusader Kings II stood out from earlier Paradox games in that it attracted a more widespread audience, contributing to the growth of the company.

Gameplay
The game is a dynasty simulator in which the player controls a medieval dynasty from 1066 to 1453. Players are able to start at any date between January 1, 1066, and December 31, 1337, though the Old Gods and Charlemagne DLCs allow for earlier start dates of 867 and 769 respectively, and the Iron Century update would later allow a start in the year 936. Through the strategic use of war, marriages and assassinations, among many other things, the player works to achieve success for their dynasty.

The game depicts or mentions numerous historical figures, including William the Conqueror, Charlemagne, Genghis Khan, Harold Godwinson, Robert Guiscard, Robert the Bruce, Harald Hardrada, El Cid, Constantine X Doukas, Harun al-Rashid, Alexios I Komnenos, Richard the Lionheart, Ivar the Boneless, Alfred the Great, Baldwin I of Jerusalem, Boleslaw the Bold and Saladin, but allows for the player to choose less-significant figures such as minor dukes and counts, and for the creation of entirely new characters with the use of the Ruler Designer DLC.

Success is defined solely by the player. The only in-game objective is to obtain as many prestige and piety points as possible in order to surpass the various historically relevant European dynasties in a fictional prestige ranking system (the three most prestigious ones being the Capetian, the Rurikid and the Habsburg dynasties). The game ends when the player's current character dies without an heir of the same dynasty to succeed him/her, when all landed titles of the count rank or above are stripped from all members of the player's dynasty (including themselves), or when the game reaches its end in 1453 (unless the player is in "observer mode", at which point the game will continue onwards).

The game employs a genetics and education system, through which children inherit many traits, culture, religion and skills from their parents and guardians. This adds an additional layer of strategy to marriages, such that a player will attempt not only to form beneficial alliances, but also to select marriage partners with strong heritable traits to maximise the quality of offspring and thus strengthen the dynasty. This requires balancing sometimes conflicting interests; for example, while one possible marriage might allow some desirable alliance to be formed with another ruler, it may also require marrying a spouse with some undesirable traits. Such a trade-off can occur in the reverse as well: one possible spouse could possess highly desirable traits but yield no new alliances for the player's dynasty.

While the player can choose to play as any noble with at least a county in their possession, there are some government types that are unplayable without modding the game. These include theocracies (such as The Papacy), holy orders, mercenaries, and republics. The merchant republic government type, however, is playable with The Republic expansion. In addition, all non-Christian characters are unplayable without the purchase of the DLC that unlocks them, including Muslims, Jews, Hindus, Buddhists, Taoists, Zoroastrians, Jains, Zunists and various pagans.

Expansions and mods

Mods
Aside from the official expansion packs, third-party mods are available on sites such as the Steam Workshop.

When a Crusader Kings II (CK2) game is launched, Paradox servers collect information about the game setup such as game version, single player or multiplayer, and what mods are in use. Data collected on 23 April 2017 showed that at least 42% of users on that day had activated at least one mod. Data also reveals that multiplayer "cheat mods" are popular, too, as are graphics or GUI mods.

A few accuracy and realism mods have also been produced by fans, such as Historical Immersion Project and CK2+. A large number of total conversion mods are also available:

A Game of Thrones, based on George R. R. Martin's A Song of Ice and Fire fantasy novels, released in May 2012, which "has long been the most popular CK2 mod".
 After the End, which is set in the 27th century in a post-apocalyptic North America.
 Elder Kings, based on Bethesda Softworks's The Elder Scrolls video game series
 Middle Earth Project, based on the works of J. R. R. Tolkien.
 When the World Stopped Making Sense, set in the Dark Ages.
 Witcher Kings, based on Andrzej Sapkowski's The Witcher series of novels, as well as CD Projekt Red's video game series.

Paradox actively encourages such modding, and the company regularly tweaked the game in order to make modding easier.

Release and reception

A demo was released on February 4, 2012, which featured four playable characters over a 20-year span. A marketing campaign for the game featured light comedy videos on the concept of the Seven Deadly Sins.

The game, based on the Clausewitz Engine, was met with generally positive reviews and has attained a metascore of 82 at Metacritic. GameSpot reviewer Shaun McInnis stated: "Through a complex system of diplomacy and backstabbing, Crusader Kings II makes every power struggle an engrossing one" and he lauded the gameplay while noting the "lackluster tutorials". IGN summed up their review by saying "an intense learning curve, but a unique strategy experience". IGN rated the gameplay and "lasting appeal" a 9/10. A reviewer for Rock, Paper, Shotgun wrote that Crusader Kings II was "probably the most human strategy game" he ever played. Rob Zacny of PC PowerPlay, who gave the game a 7/10 score, called it a "brilliant treatment of feudalism in terms of strategy and story" but also stated it "requires major investment to overcome information overload". Kotaku named the game as one of their game of the year nominees.

By September 2014, Crusader Kings II had sold more than 1 million copies, with the expansion pack and DLC sales totaling over 7 million units. This makes it Paradox's most successful release prior to the debut of Europa Universalis IV. According to Paradox Interactive, the game was played by an average of 12,500 players every day, with an average playtime of 99 hours per player.

See also 

Hearts of Iron IV
Stellaris
 Imperator: Rome

References

External links

Official wiki for Crusader Kings II

2012 video games
Government simulation video games
Grand strategy video games
Linux games
MacOS games
Windows games
Video games set in the Middle Ages
Islam in fiction
Paradox Interactive games
Real-time strategy video games
Video game sequels
Video games set in the 11th century
Video games with expansion packs
Proprietary software that uses SDL
Video games with Steam Workshop support
Video games set in the Byzantine Empire
Video games set in the Crusades
Video games developed in Sweden
Cultural depictions of Saladin
Cultural depictions of Charlemagne
Cultural depictions of El Cid
Cultural depictions of Richard I of England
Cultural depictions of Alfred the Great
Genghis Khan video games
Cultural depictions of Ivar the Boneless
Video games set in Germany
Video games set in the 12th century
Video games set in the 13th century
Video games set in the 14th century
Video games set in the 15th century
Multiplayer and single-player video games